Dalab-e Bala (also Romanized as Dālāb-e Bālā; also known as Dālāb-e ‘Olyā) is a village in Kuhdasht-e Shomali Rural District, in the Central District of Kuhdasht County, Lorestan Province, Iran. At the 2006 census, its population was 61, in 10 families.

References 

Towns and villages in Kuhdasht County